Goat Fashion is a London based womenswear label. It was founded in 2001 by Jane Lewis as a small range of tailored separates and knits using cashmere, wool and silk yarns and has grown into a complete ready-to-wear collection. The brand is stocked by boutiques and stores predominantly in the UK. The Goat trademark was sold in 2020 and in 2021 Goat Fashion rebranded to Jane, named after the Founder and Creative Director Jane Lewis. The website changed to JaneAtelier.com.

Fans

Celebrity clients of the label include the Duchess of Cambridge, Victoria Beckham and Lana Del Rey.

Company timeline

 2012 – Goat received the backing of Private Equity fund Amery Capital 
 2012 – Goat launched an e commerce site
 2013 – Goat was named as one of the eight selected businesses for the Walpole Luxury Brands of the Future programme 
 2013 – in August, Goat invested in a London-wide billboard campaign  
 2020 – the Goat trademark was sold.
 2021 – the company rebranded to Jane and the website changed to JaneAtelier.com.

See also
 CuteCircuit
 Anna Valentine
 Finery (company)

References

External links
 Jane Atelier Official Website

Clothing companies based in London
Clothing companies of the United Kingdom
Clothing companies of England
Clothing companies established in 2001